Perry Local School District is a public school district serving students in nearly all of Perry Township, Stark County, Ohio and portions of the city of Massillon, Ohio. The school district enrolls 4,700 students. There are 5 elementary schools for grades K-4. Pfeiffer Intermediate School houses grades 5-6. Edison Middle School houses 7-8. Perry High School houses 9-12. The district offers preschool at Knapp Elementary.

Schools

Elementary schools
Genoa Elementary
T.C. Knapp Elementary
Lohr Elementary
Watson Elementary
Whipple Elementary

Intermediate school
Pfeiffer Intermediate School

Middle school
Edison Middle School

High school
Perry High School

Former 
 Reedurban Elementary (demolished)
 Richville Elementary (demolished)

School districts in Stark County, Ohio
School districts established in 1853